The following by elections for Deputy took place in 2000 in Jersey.

St. Helier No. 1 District
Election date: May 2000
Judy Martin 190 votes
Harry Cole 182 votes
David Pipon 165 votes
Geno Gouveia 134 votes
Chris Whitworth 36 votes

References

By 2000
2000 in Jersey